This is a list of ice hockey players who have accumulated at least 2,000 penalties in minutes (PIMs) in the National Hockey League (NHL) through the end of the 2018–19 NHL regular season.

3,000 or more PIMs

2,500-2,999 PIMs

2,499-2,250 PIMs

2,249-2,000 PIMs

External links
All-time penalty minute leaders  from Stats Hockey
All-time penalty minute leaders from Sports City

2000 PIMs
2000 PIMs